Parliamentary elections were held in Ciskei between 19 and 23 February 1973. As there were no political parties at the time, all candidates ran as independents.

Electoral system
The Legislative Assembly had a total of 50 seats, 20 of which were elected and 30 of which were reserved for appointed chiefs. The country was divided into nine districts for the election.

Results

Aftermath
In June 1975, the High Court annulled the election of four members, including Chief Minister Lennox Sebe due to election irregularities in Zwelitsha, making Sebe ineligible to hold the post of Chief Minister. He was subsequently re-elected in a by-election on 24 October 1975 and reassumed office.

References

Ciskei
Elections in Ciskei
Non-partisan elections
February 1973 events in Africa